White Hill Field is a cricket ground in Sandys Parish, Bermuda. In June 2019, it was named as one of the two venues to host cricket matches for Bermuda's Twenty20 series against the Bahamas, and the Regional Finals of the 2018–19 ICC T20 World Cup Americas Qualifier tournament. Mid-way through the Americas Qualifier tournament, the pitch at the Bermuda National Stadium was deemed to be unsuitable, and the matches scheduled to be played at the stadium were moved to White Hill Field.

List of centuries

Twenty20 Internationals

List of five-wicket hauls

Twenty20 Internationals

References

Cricket grounds in Bermuda